This article features a listing of the top-level professional minor league sports teams based in the United States that are typically the second tier of professional sports under the major professional leagues. The minor leagues listed below also include teams outside the United States, with six in Canada (one in the NBA G League and five in the American Hockey League) and one in Mexico (NBA G League).

Triple-A minor league baseball has two leagues in the International League and Pacific Coast League, both being affiliated with Major League Baseball. Basketball and ice hockey each have one affiliated minor league, the NBA G League and American Hockey League, respectively. The USL Championship (USLC) is a Division II league below Major League Soccer as designated by the United States Soccer Federation that governs the various soccer leagues, although some MLS teams are affiliated with clubs from outside the second tier for development purposes. However, most MLS clubs now field their reserve sides in MLS Next Pro, a third-level league that launched in 2022, and the only MLS club that has not announced plans to field a Next Pro side in 2023 is CF Montréal. There are no affiliated minor leagues for American or Canadian football as most of its recruiting is done through college football, and minor football leagues do not historically have long lifespans before folding, although currently there are three existing spring leagues: USFL,XFL and MLFB.

Teams that will join a league for a future season are indicated in italics.

See also
List of developmental and minor sports leagues
List of American and Canadian cities by number of major professional sports franchises
List of professional sports teams in the United States and Canada
List of auto racing tracks in the United States by city
List of professional golf tournaments in the United States by city
List of soccer clubs in the United States by city

Minor league
Minor and developmental leagues in professional sports